E. A. M. Swazy (1809–1862) was an American politician.

Swazy was born in Vermont in 1809 and married Phoebe Stoddard. He served in the Iowa Legislative Assembly from 1838 to 1840, representing Van Buren County as a Democrat from District 4 of the Iowa Council. Outside of politics, Swazy was engaged in farming and the practice of law. He died in Farmington, Iowa, in 1862.

References

Farmers from Iowa
Iowa lawyers
1809 births
People from Vermont
1862 deaths
Iowa Democrats
Members of the Iowa Territorial Legislature
19th-century American politicians
People from Van Buren County, Iowa
19th-century American lawyers